"This Is Your Brain" is a song recorded by American country music artist Joe Diffie.  It was released in March 1997 as the first single from the album Twice Upon a Time.  The song reached #25 on the Billboard Hot Country Singles & Tracks chart.  The song was written by Kelly Garrett and Craig Wiseman.

Chart performance

References

1997 singles
1997 songs
Joe Diffie songs
Songs written by Craig Wiseman
Epic Records singles
Songs written by Kelly Garrett (songwriter)